Markanibougou is a village and seat of the commune of Baguindadougou in the Ségou Cercle in the Ségou Region of southern-central Mali.

References

Populated places in Ségou Region